Molana Syed Abdul Khaliq Pirzada Al-Azhari, born in 1950 in Kabirwala Shareef, Multan Shareef, Punjab Province, Pakistan, is a professor and member of the Senate of the Islamic Republic of Pakistan. He is a member of Muttahida Quami Movement (MQM). Dr. Pirzada comes from a Religious and political family. Syed Abdul Khaliq Pirzada is the son of famous religious Personality of Subcontinent "Hazrat Syed Mohammad Saeed Ahmed Pirzada" (حضرت سید محمد سعید احمد شاہ پیرزادہ)  known as (Peer Pathan, Peer Afghani پیر پٹھان ، پیر افغانی), a prominent Majzoob and Ex-Gaddi Nasheen of Dargah Kabirwala Shareef (Khanewal Shareef) Pakistan.

Early life and education
Syed Abdul Khaliq Pirzada studied at the local Madrassa, a religious Institute, in Multan, and then in maktab (School) Jamia Ashrafia Lahore. Later, Pirzada was accepted at the Jamia Ashrafia where he studied Islamic Studies earning double M.A degree in Arabic and Islamic Studies.

Higher education
In 1978,  Pirzada went to Cairo, Egypt. After being accepted at the Al-Azhar University
Unlike many of his colleagues who have only received degrees from madrassas, Pirzada is a "refined product" of Al-Azhar University, studied and researched in World Comparative religions there, under reputed religious and divinity research scholars of Al-Azhar University. After four years, Syed Abdul Khaliq Pirzada completed and published his master's thesis on Dawat-El-Islam with thesis and was awarded M.A in Religious Studies from the Al-Azhar University Cairo Egypt. After five years of M.Phil. in 1992 he completed his Ph.D. and published his thesis on World Comparative Religions.

Political career
Dr. Syed Abdul Khaliq Pirzada) is a politician from Karachi, Sindh, Pakistan.
In 1998, Pirzada came back to Pakistan and joined MQM.. He took the highest number of votes in Senate Election (2006) Syed Abdul Khaliq Pirzada was also nominated by his party as a candidate for the Chairman of Senate of Pakistan where he unsuccessfully contested against Muhammad Mian Soomro. He is Parliamentary leader of the political party MQM. Syed Abdul Khaliq Pirzada commonly known as Peer Saheb of Kabirwala (Multan Shareef) is a Pakistani politician, parliamentarian and a prominent member of Senate of Islamic Republic of Pakistan. Syed Abdul Khaliq Pirzada was elected as member of Senate on a ticket of MQM from (Sindh) in 2006.

References

Muttahida Qaumi Movement politicians
1950 births
Living people
Members of the Senate of Pakistan
Jamia Ashrafia alumni